"The Scholar-Gipsy" (1853) is a poem by Matthew Arnold, based on a 17th-century Oxford story found in Joseph Glanvill's The Vanity of Dogmatizing (1661, etc.). It has often been called one of the best and most popular of Arnold's poems, and is also familiar to music-lovers through Ralph Vaughan Williams' choral work An Oxford Elegy, which sets lines from this poem and from its companion-piece, "Thyrsis".

The original story 

Arnold prefaces the poem with an extract from Glanvill, which tells the story of an impoverished Oxford student who left his studies to join a band of gipsies, and so ingratiated himself with them that they told him many of the secrets of their trade. After some time he was discovered and recognised by two of his former Oxford associates, who learned from him that the gipsies "had a traditional kind of learning among them, and could do wonders by the power of imagination, their fancy binding that of others."  When he had learned everything that the gipsies could teach him, he said, he would leave them and give an account of these secrets to the world.

In 1929 Marjorie Hope Nicolson argued that the identity of this mysterious figure was the Flemish alchemist Francis Mercury van Helmont.

Synopsis 

Arnold begins "The Scholar Gipsy" in pastoral mode, invoking a shepherd and describing the beauties of a rural scene, with Oxford in the distance. He then repeats the gist of Glanvill's story, but extends it with an account of rumours that the scholar gipsy was again seen from time to time around Oxford. Arnold imagines him as a shadowy figure who can even now be glimpsed in the Berkshire and Oxfordshire countryside, "waiting for the spark from Heaven to fall", and claims to have once seen him himself. He entertains a doubt as to the scholar gypsy's still being alive after two centuries, but then shakes off the thought. He cannot have died:

The scholar gipsy, having renounced such a life, is 

and is therefore not subject to ageing and death.  Arnold describes

and implores the scholar gipsy to avoid all who suffer from it, in case he too should be infected and die. Arnold ends with an extended simile of a Tyrian merchant seaman who flees from the irruption of Greek competitors to seek a new world in Iberia.

Writing and publication 

"The Scholar Gipsy" was written in 1853, probably immediately after "Sohrab and Rustum".  In an 1857 letter to his brother Tom, referring to their friendship with Theodore Walrond and the poet Arthur Hugh Clough, Arnold wrote that "The Scholar Gipsy" was "meant to fix the remembrance of those delightful wanderings of ours in the Cumner hills before they were quite effaced". Arnold revisited these scenes many years later in his elegy for Arthur Hugh Clough, "Thyrsis", a companion-piece and, some would say, a sequel to "The Scholar Gipsy".

"The Scholar Gipsy", like "Requiescat" and "Sohrab and Rustum", first appeared in Arnold's Poems (1853), published by Longmans. During the 20th century it was many times published as a booklet, either by itself or with "Thyrsis". It appears in The Oxford Book of English Verse and in some editions of Palgrave's Golden Treasury despite its being, at 250 lines, considerably longer than most of the poems in either anthology.

Critical opinions

Notes

External links 

 "Matthew Arnold, 'The Scholar Gipsy,' and the Cumnor Hills" – a topographical essay by Dick Sullivan
 Critical study by R. A. Jayantha
 Glanvil's story of The Scholar Gipsy

Poetry by Matthew Arnold
1853 poems
Vale of White Horse
Culture in Oxford
Fictional representations of Romani people